The 2017 Lory Meagher Cup was the ninth staging of the Lory Meagher Cup hurling championship since its establishment by the Gaelic Athletic Association in 2009. It is the fourth tier of senior inter-county championship hurling.

Cavan returned to senior inter-county hurling in 2017 by entering The Lory Meagher Cup. They had disbanded midway through the 2011 season.

The participating teams were

Britain (2): Lancashire and  Warwickshire

Connacht (2):  Leitrim and  Sligo

Ulster (2):  Cavan and  Fermanagh

Louth, the 2016 champions, play in the Nicky Rackard Cup having won promotion.

Table

Table

Leitrim are ranked above Sligo due to their superior head to head record.

Round 1

Matches

Round 2

Matches

Round 3

Matches

Round 4

Matches

Round 5

Matches

Final

The winners of the Lory Meagher Cup are automatically promoted to the 2018 Nicky Rackard Cup.

Scoring statistics

Top scorers overall

Top scorers in a single game

References

Lory
Lory Meagher Cup